IJM may refer to:

 IJM Corporation, a company in Malaysia
 ImageJ Macro language, a programming language
 International Justice Mission, a non-profit human rights organization
 Institut Jacques Monod, a research institute in Paris, France
 Illinois Journal of Mathematics